Aisling Williams (born 7 August 1990) is a British artistic gymnast, representing her nation at international competitions.

She participated at  the 2007 World Artistic Gymnastics Championships in Stuttgart, Germany.

She was not selected to compete at the 2008 Summer Olympics.

References

External links 

 Aisling Williams british gymnast performs on floor at the british gymnastics championships 2006 Stock Photo - martin lauricella

1990 births
British female artistic gymnasts
Living people